Secret Rivals a.k.a. Northern Leg, Southern Fist aka Silver Fox Rivals is a 1976 kung fu film directed by James Nam and Ng See Yuen and starring Hwang Jang-lee, John Liu and Wong Tao. The film was shot on location in South Korea and Hong Kong.

Plot
Northern Leg (John Liu) travels across China thru Seoul to find the man responsible for the death of his parents. The culprit is none other than the Silver Fox (Hwang Jang-lee), a feared martial arts expert and bandit. Silver Fox has also caught the attention of Southern Fist (Wong Tao), a government agent. While Southern Fist and Northern Leg are both after the same man, they discover that alone they are no match for Silver Fox. The two heroes must combine their skills, knowing that it is the only way to gain success against their awesome adversary.

In the course of finding and defeating the Silver Fox, both Northern Leg and Southern Fist fall for the same woman, the daughter of the owner of the inn they stay at for the duration of the movie. Throughout the movie they both vie for her attention, asking the butler questions at the inn, as well as a child who follows Southern Fist throughout the film.

Cast
Hwang Jang-lee – Silver Fox
John Liu (actor) – Northern Leg Shao Yi-fei
Wong Tao – Southern Fist Shang Yi-wei
Lee Ye-min - Prince
Nam Seok-hoon - Lung Yi
Elton Chong - Black Fox (Silver Fox's Student)
Yeo Su-jin - Ching Chin-chin
Park Dong-young - Prince's Bodyguard
Kim Wang-kuk - Prince's Bodyguard
Ma Do-sik - Prince's Bodyguard
To Wai-wo - Russian's student
Tong Kam-tong - thug
Yuen Biao - Russian's student
Yuen Wah - thug

References

External links
 

Kung fu films
Hong Kong martial arts films
1976 martial arts films
1976 films
Films shot in South Korea
Films shot in Hong Kong
1970s Hong Kong films